FK Tatra Kisač (Serbian Cyrillic: ФК Татра Кисач, Slovak: FK Tatra Kysáč), or simply Tatra Kisač, is a football club based in Kisač near Novi Sad, Serbia. They currently play in the GPFL Novi Sad.

History
The club was founded in 1929.

The club's logo is a similar to the logo of Slovan Bratislava.

Supporters
The Tatra's supporters group as known as Ultra Tatra and Blue Boys.

External links
 FK Tatra Kisač at srbijasport.net

Football clubs in Serbia
Football clubs in Vojvodina
Association football clubs established in 1929
1929 establishments in Serbia
Slovaks of Vojvodina